Degrees north (also styled °N) may refer to latitude at or above the equator. It may also refer to:

55 Degrees North, BBC television drama series 
66°NORTH, Icelandic clothing manufacturer
71 Degrees North, 2010 TV series

See also
Degree (disambiguation)
North (disambiguation)